is a prefecture of Japan in the Tōhoku region. The prefecture's capital, largest city, and namesake is the city of Aomori. Aomori is the northernmost prefecture on Japan's main island, Honshu, and is bordered by the Pacific Ocean to the east, Iwate Prefecture to the southeast, Akita Prefecture to the southwest, the Sea of Japan to the west, and Hokkaido across the Tsugaru Strait to the north. Approximately 45 percent of Aomori Prefecture's residents live in its two core cities, Aomori and Hachinohe, which lie on coastal plains. The majority of the prefecture is covered in forested mountain ranges, with population centers occupying valleys and plains. Aomori is the third-most populous prefecture in the Tōhoku region, after Miyagi Prefecture and Fukushima Prefecture. Mount Iwaki, an active stratovolcano, is the prefecture's highest point, at almost .

Humans have inhabited the prefecture for at least 15,000 years, and the oldest evidence of pottery in Japan was discovered at the Jōmon period Odai Yamamoto I site. After centuries of rule by the Nanbu and Tsugaru clans, the prefecture was formed out of the northern part of Mutsu Province during the Meiji Restoration. Though the prefecture remains dominated by primary sector industries, it also serves as a transportation hub due to its location at the northern end of Honshu.

History

Jōmon period

The oldest evidence of pottery in Japan was found at the Odai Yamamoto I site in the town of Sotogahama in the northwestern part of the prefecture. The relics found there suggest that the Jōmon period began about 15,000 years ago. By 7,000 BCE fishing cultures had developed along the shores of the prefecture which were three meters higher than the present day shoreline. Around 3,900 BCE settlement at the Sannai-Maruyama Site in the present-day city of Aomori began. The settlement shows evidence of the wide interaction between the site's inhabitants and people from across Jōmon period Japan, including Hokkaido and Kyushu. The settlement of Sannai-Maruyama ended around 2300 BCE due to unknown reasons. Its abandonment was likely due to the population's subsistence economy being unable to result in sustained growth, with its end being spurred on by the reduced amount of natural resources during the neoglaciation. The Jōmon period continued up to 300 BCE in present-day Aomori Prefecture at the Kamegaoka site in the city of Tsugaru where the Shakōki-dogū was found.

Yayoi period to Heian period

During the Yayoi period, the area that would become Aomori Prefecture was impacted by the migration of settlers from continental Asia to a lesser extent than the rest of Japan to the south and west of the region. The region, known then as Michinoku, was inhabited by the Emishi. It is not clear if the Emishi were the descendants of the Jōmon people, a group of the Ainu people, or if both the Ainu and Emishi were descended from the Jōmon people. The northernmost tribe of the Emishi that inhabited what would become Aomori Prefecture was known as the Tsugaru. Historic records mention a series of destructive eruptions in 917 from the volcano at Lake Towada. The eruptive activity peaked on 17 August. Throughout the Heian period the Emishi were slowly subdued by the Imperial Court in Kyoto before being incorporated into Mutsu Province by the Northern Fujiwara around 1094. The Northern Fujiwara set up the port settlement Tosaminato in present-day Goshogawara to develop trade between their lands, Kyoto, and continental Asia. The Northern Fujiwara were deposed in 1189 by Minamoto no Yoritomo who would go on to establish the Kamakura shogunate.

Kamakura period
Minamoto no Yoritomo incorporated Mutsu Province into the holdings of the Kamakura shogunate. Nanbu Mitsuyuki was awarded vast estates in Nukanobu District after he had joined Minamoto no Yoritomo at the Battle of Ishibashiyama and the conquest of the Northern Fujiwara. Nanbu Mitsuyuki built Shōjujidate Castle in what is now Nanbu, Aomori. The eastern area of the current prefecture was dominated by horse ranches, and the Nanbu grew powerful and wealthy on the supply of warhorses. These horse ranches were fortified stockades, numbered one through nine (Ichinohe through Kunohe), and were awarded to the six sons of Nanbu Mitsuyuki, forming the six main branches of the Nanbu clan. The northwestern part of the prefecture was awarded to the Andō clan for their role in driving the Northern Fujiwara out of Tosaminato. The port was expanded under the rule of the Andō clan. They traded heavily with the Ainu in Ezo. However, conflict would break out between the Ainu and the Andō clan in 1268 and again in the 1320s. The conflict was put down after the Nanbu intervened at the behest of the shogunate. The conflict weakened the Kamakura shogunate in its later years, while the Andō were split into northern (Andō) and southern (Akita) divisions.

Muromachi period

At the onset of the Ashikaga shogunate, the Nanbu and Andō continued to rule the area, with the Nanbu controlling the current prefecture's southeastern section and the Andō controlling the Shimokita and Tsugaru peninsulas. The Andō also were involved with controlling the fringes of Ezo, splitting their attention. In 1336, the Andō completed construction of Horikoshi Castle during the Northern and Southern Courts period. During the Muromachi, the Nanbu slowly began edging the Andō out of present-day Aomori Prefecture. The Andō were pushed out of Tosaminato in 1432, retreating to Ezo, giving the Nanbu control over all their lands. The port settlement would fall into disrepair under the Nanbu.

Sengoku period
During the Sengoku period the Nanbu clan collapsed into several rival factions. One faction under Ōura Tamenobu asserted their control over the Hirosaki Domain. According to later Tsugaru clan records, the clan was descended from the noble Fujiwara clan and had an accent claim to ownership of the Tsugaru region on the Tsugaru Peninsula and the area surrounding Mount Iwaki in the northwestern corner of Mutsu Province; however, according to the records of their rivals, the Nanbu clan, clan progenitor Ōura Tamenobu was born as either Nanbu Tamenobu or Kuji Tamenobu, from a minor branch house of the Nanbu and was driven from the clan due to discord with his elder brother. In any event, the Ōura were hereditary  under the Nanbu clan's local magistrate Ishikawa Takanobu; however, in 1571 Tamenobu attacked and killed Ishikawa and began taking the Nanbu clan's castles in the Tsugaru region one after another. He captured castles at Ishikawa, Daikoji and Aburakawa, and soon gathered support of many former Nanbu retainers in the region. After pledging fealty to Toyotomi Hideyoshi, he was confirmed as an independent warlord in 1590 and changed his name to "Tsugaru", formally establishing the Tsugaru clan. Tsugaru Tamenobu assisted Hideyoshi at the Battle of Odawara, and accompanied his retinue to Hizen during the Korean Expedition. Afterwards, he sided with Tokugawa Ieyasu during the Battle of Sekigahara in 1600.

Edo period

After the establishment of the Tokugawa Shogunate, the Nanbu ruled the Shimokita Peninsula and the districts immediately to the south of it. The area to the west of the Nanbu's holdings and to the north of the lands held by the Akita clan were all controlled by the Tsugaru clan, from their capital at Hirosaki. Work on Hirosaki Castle was completed in 1611, replacing Horikoshi Castle as the Tsugaru clan's fortress. By 1631, the Tsugaru clan had solidified their control over their gains made during the Sengoku period. Mutsu Province was struck by the Tenmei famine between 1781 and 1789, due to lower than usual temperatures that were exacerbated by volcanic eruptions at Mount Iwaki, near the Tsugaru clan's capital, Hirosaki, between November 1782 and June 1783.

At the beginning of the Edo period, the last pockets of Ainu people in Honshu still lived in the mountainous areas on the peninsulas of the prefecture. They interacted with the ruling clans to some extent, but they primarily lived off of fishing the waters of Mutsu Bay and the Tsugaru Strait. However, the Tsugaru clan made two big pushes to assimilate the Ainu, the first came in 1756 and the second came in 1809. Records show that the clan was successful in wiping out the Ainu culture in their holdings, though some geographic names in Aomori Prefecture still retain their original Ainu names.

Meiji Restoration to World War II

Despite the 1867 resignation of the last shogun, Tokugawa Yoshinobu, by late 1868 the Boshin War had reached northern Japan. On 20 September 1868 the pro-Shōgunate Ōuetsu Reppan Dōmei was proclaimed at Morioka, the capital of the Nanbu clan who ruled Morioka Domain. The Tsugaru clan first sided with the pro-imperial forces of Satchō Alliance, and attacked nearby Shōnai Domain. However, the Tsugaru soon switched course, and briefly became a member of the Ōuetsu Reppan Dōmei. However, for reasons yet unclear, the Tsugaru backed out of the alliance and re-joined the imperial cause after a few months. The Nanbu and Tsugaru clans resumed their old rivalry and fought at the Battle of Noheji.

As a result of the minor skirmish, the Tsugaru clan was able to prove its defection from the Ōuetsu Reppan Dōmei and loyalty to the imperial cause. Tsugaru forces later joined the imperial army in attacking the Republic of Ezo at the Battle of Hakodate, where the pro-Shōgunate forces were finally defeated. As a result, the entire clan was able to evade the punitive measures taken by the Meiji government on other northern domains.

In 1868 Mutsu Province was broken up into five provinces in the aftermath of the Boshin War, with its namesake province, Rikuō occupying what would later become Aomori Prefecture and the northwestern corner of Iwate Prefecture. On 4 September 1871, Rikuō Province was abolished and divided, establishing today's Aomori Prefecture. Its capital was briefly located in Hirosaki, but it was moved on 23 September to the centrally located port village, Aomori.

The prefecture's new capital, Aomori, saw rapid expansion which was due to its importance as a logistic hub in northern Japan. It became a town in 1889 and then a city in 1898. On 30 October 1889, an American merchant ship, the Cheseborough wrecked off the prefecture's west coast near the village Shariki, many of the ship's crew were saved by the villagers. The Nippon Railway, a private company, completed the Tōhoku Main Line in 1891, linking Aomori to Ueno Station in Tokyo. During a military exercise on 23 January 1902, 199 soldiers died after getting lost during a blizzard in the Hakkōda Mountains incident. On 3 May 1910, a fire broke out in the Yasukata district. Fanned by strong winds, the fire quickly devastated the whole city. The conflagration claimed 26 lives and injured a further 160 residents. It destroyed 5,246 houses and burnt 19 storage sheds and 157 warehouses.

On 23 March 1945, a mudslide destroyed a section of the town of Ajigasawa, killing 87 of its inhabitants. At 10:30 p.m. on 28 July 1945, a squadron of American B-29 bombers bombed over 90% of the city of Aomori. The estimated civilian impact of the air raid on the city was the death of 1,767 people and the destruction of 18,045 homes. Infrastructure was destroyed across the prefecture including the Seikan Ferry, naval facilities in Mutsu and Misawa, Hachinohe Airfield, and the ports and railways of Aomori and Hachinohe.

1945 to present
During the Occupation of Japan, Aomori's military bases were controlled by the US military. Hachinohe Airfield was occupied until 1950, and was called Camp Haugen. Misawa Air Base was occupied and rebuilt by the United States Army Air Forces; the base has seen a US military presence since then. Radio Aomori made its first broadcast in 1953.  Four years later, the first fish auctions were held. 1958 saw the completion of the Municipal Fish Market as well as the opening of the Citizen's Hospital. In the same year, the Tsugaru Line established a rail connection with the village of Minmaya at the tip of the Tsugaru Peninsula.

In March 1985, after 23 years of labor and a financial investment of 690 billion yen, the Seikan Tunnel finally linked the islands of Honshū and Hokkaidō, thereby becoming the longest tunnel of its kind in the world. Almost exactly three years later, on March 13, railroad service was inaugurated on the Tsugaru Kaikyo Line. The tunnel's opening to rail traffic saw the end of the Seikan Ferry rail service. During their 80 years of service, the Seikan rail ferries sailed between Aomori and Hakodate some 720,000 times, carrying 160 million passengers. It continues to operate between the cities, ferrying automobile traffic and passengers rather than trains.

Aomori Public College opened in April 1993. In April 1995, Aomori Airport began offering regular international air service to Seoul, South Korea, and Khabarovsk, Russia; however, the flights to Khabarovsk were discontinued in 2004. In June 2007, four North Korean defectors reached Aomori Prefecture, after having been at sea for six days, marking the second known case ever where defectors have successfully reached Japan by boat. In March 2011, a magnitude 9.0 earthquake struck the east coast of Japan. The southeastern coast of Aomori Prefecture was affected by the resulting tsunami. Buildings along harbors were damaged along with boats thrown about in the streets.

Geography

Aomori Prefecture is the northernmost prefecture in the Tōhoku region, lying on the northern end of the island of Honshu. It faces Hokkaido from across the Tsugaru Strait and it borders Akita and Iwate in the south. The prefecture is flanked by the Pacific Ocean to the east and the Sea of Japan to the west with the Tsugaru Strait linking those bodies of water to the north of the prefecture. The islets of Kyūroku-jima in the Sea of Japan are the prefecture's westernmost point. Oma, at the northwestern tip of the axe-shaped Shimokita Peninsula, is the northernmost point of Honshu. The Shimokita and Tsugaru Peninsulas enclose Mutsu Bay. Between those peninsulas lies the smaller Natsudomari Peninsula, the northern end of the Ōu Mountains. The three peninsulas are prominently visible in the prefecture's symbol, a stylized map.

Lake Ogawara, a brackish lake at the base of the Shimokita Peninsula, is the eleventh largest lake in Japan, the largest brackish lake in the Tōhoku area, and the prefecture's largest lake. Lake Towada, a lake that sits in a volcanic caldera, straddles Aomori's boundary with Akita. The lake is a primary feature of Towada-Hachimantai National Park and is the largest caldera lake in Honshu. Also within the park, the Oirase River flows east towards the Pacific Ocean from Lake Towada. Another feature of the park, the Hakkōda Mountains, an expansive volcanic group, rises in the lands to the south of the city of Aomori and north of Lake Towada.

Shirakami-Sanchi, a UNESCO World Heritage Site, is located in the Shirakami Mountains in the western part of the prefecture. The site contains the largest surviving virgin beech forest in East Asia which is home to over 87 species of birds. Mount Iwaki, a stratovolcano and the prefecture's highest point lies to northeast of the Shirakami Mountains. The lands to the east and northeast of Mount Iwaki are an expansive floodplain that is drained by the Iwaki River. Hirosaki, the former capital of the Tsugaru clan, sits on the banks of the river.

As of 31 March 2019, 12% of the total land area of the prefecture was designated as Natural Parks, namely the Towada-Hachimantai and Sanriku Fukkō National Parks; Shimokita Hantō and Tsugaru Quasi-National Parks; and Asamushi-Natsudomari, Ashino Chishōgun, Iwaki Kōgen, Kuroishi Onsenkyō, Nakuidake, Ōwani Ikarigaseki Onsenkyō, and Tsugaru Shirakami Prefectural Natural Parks; and Mount Bonju Prefectural Forest.

Cities, towns, and villages

Climate
The climate of Aomori Prefecture is relatively cool for the most part. Variations in climate exist between the eastern (Pacific Ocean side) and the western (Sea of Japan side) parts of the prefecture. This is in part due to the Ōu Mountains that run north to south in the middle of the prefecture, dividing the two regions. The western side is subject to heavy monsoons and little sunshine which results in heavy snowfall during the winter. The eastern side is subject to low clouds brought in by northeasterly winds during the summer months, known locally as Yamase winds, from June through August, with temperatures staying relatively low. However, there are instances of Yamase winds making summers so cold that food production is hindered.

Temperature comparison

Demographics

A person living in or from Aomori Prefecture is referred to as an Aomorian. As of 2017, the prefecture had a total population of 1.28 million residents, accounting for just over 1 percent of Japan's total population. In 2018, Aomori Prefecture saw the second largest decrease in the number of Japanese citizens out of any prefecture in the country. Only neighboring Akita Prefecture lost more citizens than Aomori. 

In 2017, 23,529 people moved out of Aomori, while 17,454 people moved to the prefecture. In 2018, about 590,000 of the prefecture's residents were men and 670,000 were women, 10.8 percent of the population was below the age of 15, 56.6 percent of residents were between the ages of 15 and 64, and 32.6 percent was above the age of 64. In the same year the prefecture had a density of 130.9 people per square kilometer. In 2015, about 3,425 foreign-born immigrants lived in Aomori, making up just 0.26 percent of the prefecture's population, the lowest of any prefecture.

Economy

Like much of the Tōhoku Region, Aomori Prefecture remains dominated by primary sector industries, such as farming, forestry and fishing. The prefecture's forestry industry is centered around the cultivation and harvesting of hiba, a cypress tree utilized in construction of wooden structures across the country. In 2015, its economy had a GDP of 4,541.2 billion yen which made up about 0.83 percent of Japan's economy. Aomori Prefecture generates the largest amount of wind energy out of the prefectures of Japan, with large wind farms located on the Shimokita Peninsula. The peninsula is also home to the inactive Rokkasho Reprocessing Plant that is owned by Japan Nuclear Fuel Limited, a company headquartered in the village of Rokkasho that is involved in the production of nuclear fuel, as well as the reprocessing, storage, and disposal of nuclear waste. The city of Hachinohe is home to the Pacific Metals Company, a manufacturer of ferronickel products.

Agriculture
Aomori Prefecture is a leading agricultural region in Japan. It is Japan's largest producer of apples, accounting for 59 percent of Japan's total apple production in 2018. The cultivation of apples in the prefecture began in 1875 when the prefecture was given three varieties of western origin to grow. The apples are consumed within Japan and exported to the United States, China, Taiwan, and Thailand. Aomori is also ranked highly in the nation's production of redcurrant, burdock, and garlic, accounting for 81, 37, and 66 percent, respectively, of the country's production.

Aomori also boasts being the home to Hakkōda cattle, a rare, region-specific breed of Japanese Shorthorn. The town of Gonohe has a long history as a breeding center for horses of exceptional quality, popular among the samurai. With the decline of the samurai, Gonohe's horses continued to be bred for their meat. The Aomori coast along Mutsu Bay is a large source of scallops, but they are particularly a specialty of the town Hiranai where the calm water around Natsudomari Peninsula makes a good home for them.

Tourism

Tourism has been a growing sector of Aomori Prefecture's economy. It was among the top five prefectures of Japan in terms of growth in foreign tourists between 2012 and 2017. This influx of foreign tourists has led to the construction of more hotels in Aomori. Major draws to the prefecture are its historic sites, museums, and national parks. Several of the prefecture's Jōmon period historic sites were nominated in January 2009 to become World Heritage Sites. If approved, the archaeological sites would join Shirakami-Sanchi as the prefecture's second World Heritage Site. Tourist access to Shirakami-Sanchi is heavily restricted to tourists due to its delicate ecosystem, though several water features, trails, and roads can be accessed by its visitors. About 35.2 million domestic travelers visited Aomori Prefecture in 2016, while about 95,000 foreign tourists visited in 2017.

Military
Aomori Prefecture and the Tsugaru Strait are of strategic value to both Japan and the United States, as the strait serves as an access point for the United States Navy into the Sea of Japan where they can put pressure on Russia, China, and North Korea. The prefecture also hosts Misawa Air Base, the only combined, joint U.S. service installation in the western Pacific servicing Army, Navy, and Air Force, as well as the Japan Self-Defense Forces.

Culture

Traditional crafts

The Tsugaru region of Aomori Prefecture is the birthplace of the traditional Tsugaru-jamisen, a virtuosic style of playing shamisen that is deeply intwined with the region's identity and history. A notable player of the style was Takahashi Chikuzan, a blind musician from Hiranai who wandered around the country and eventually gained nationwide appeal. Aomori Prefecture is also where the decorative embroidery styles, kogin-zashi and Nanbu hishizashi originated as more utilitarian techniques during the Edo period. The peasant women of the area, who created the styles, used them to make linen clothing more robust and warm during the harsh winters since cotton was unavailable to the lower class. Wooden horse figures called Yawata-uma have been made in the former holdings of the Nanbu for 700 years.

Cuisine

The Aomori area has given rise to several soups: ke porridge which consists of miso soup with diced root vegetables and wild plants such as butterbur and bracken with tofu from the Tsugaru area; ichigoni, a sea urchin roe and abalone soup in which the sea urchin roe looks like strawberries, known as ichigo in Japanese, from the town of Hashikami; hittsumi a roux with chicken and vegetables from the Nanbu area; Hachinohe senbei soup a hearty soup with Nanbu senbei loaded with vegetables and chicken; jappa-jiru a vegetable soup with cod roe from Aomori; and keiran a red bean dumpling soy sauce soup served during special occasions on the Shimokita Peninsula. Another dish that was created in the area surrounding Mutsu Bay is kaiya in the Tsugaru area or kayaki on the Shimokita Peninsula, it is a boiled miso and egg dish mixed with fish or scallop meat on a large scallop shell that serves as both the cookware and serveware. In 2006, the production of aged black garlic began in Aomori Prefecture. The prefecture has since become the largest producer of the superfood in Japan.

Festivals

During late April hanami festivals are held across the prefecture, with the most prominent of the festivals being located on the grounds of Hirosaki Castle. Summer and autumn hold many distinct festivals with bright lights, floats, dancing and music. Winter is centered on snow festivals where attendees can view ice sculptures and enjoy local cuisine inside an ice hut.

Arts and literature
Aomori Prefecture has produced several writers and artists. Osamu Dazai, the writer of Japan's second most popular novel No Longer Human, is one of the prefecture's best-known writers. Shunsuke Kikuchi, a composer for series such as Dragon Ball and Doraemon, was born in the city of Hirosaki. The creator of the supernatural manga series Shaman King, Hiroyuki Takei, is from the village of Yomogita in northwestern Aomori. The comedian Daimaō Kosaka, known widely for his viral single "PPAP (Pen-Pineapple-Apple-Pen)", was born in Aomori Prefecture. Sōsaku-hanga artist Shikō Munakata was born in Aomori. Much of his art was inspired by the prefecture's natural qualities and rural culture.

Sports

The two largest cities of the prefecture, Aomori and Hachinohe, both host professional sports teams. Both cities have professional soccer clubs in the Japan Professional Football League: Aomori's ReinMeer Aomori and Hachinohe's Vanraure Hachinohe. Other professional sports teams in the two cities include the Aomori Wat's, a basketball team from Aomori in the B.League and the Tohoku Free Blades, an ice hockey team from Hachinohe that competes in the Asia League.

Aomori Prefecture hosted the 2003 Asian Winter Games from 1 February to 8 February 2003. Approximately 1,200 athletes from 29 Asian countries participated in the games. Five venues across the prefecture held 51 different events. Aomori Prefecture is also slated to host the 80th National Sports Festival of Japan in 2025, though it is likely the event will be postponed for a year due to the impact of the COVID-19 pandemic. The prefecture has produced some professional athletes. Daisuke Matsuzaka, is a pitcher from the city of Aomori for the Saitama Seibu Lions of Nippon Professional Baseball who formerly pitched for the New York Mets and the Boston Red Sox. He was the winning pitcher for the Red Sox in Game 3 of the 2007 World Series in which Matsuzaka and the Red Sox would defeat the Colorado Rockies. Yoshisada Yonezuka from the town of Nakadomari was a martial arts instructor for USA Judo. He coached the team in the 1988 and 1992 Summer Olympics.

Major professional teams

Minor professional and amateur teams

Other teams
The Aomori Curling Club was a curling club of the Japan Curling Association from the city of Aomori that represented Japan in the 2006 Winter Olympics and the 2010 Winter Olympics and several World Curling Championships. The club was disbanded in 2013.

Transportation

Four major expressways pass through the prefecture: the Tōhoku Expressway, which runs south–north through center of the prefecture; the incomplete Tsugaru Expressway, running east–west in the southwestern portion of the prefecture; the partially-complete Hachinohe-Kuji Expressway that travels south–north along the prefecture's eastern coast to Hachinohe; and the partially-complete Shimokita Expressway that travels south–north along Shimokita Peninsula from the town of Noheji to the city of Mutsu.

Several auxiliary routes of the Tōhoku Expressway also serve the prefecture. The Aomori Expressway and Hachinohe Expressway, spur routes into the eastern part of the city Aomori and central Hachinohe. A spur of the Hachinohe Expressway continues northwest across the eastern side of the prefecture towards the prefecture's capital. It is made up of several named routes: the Momoishi Toll Road, the Daini-Michinoku Toll Road, the Kamikita Expressway, and the Michinoku Toll Road. Several national highways pass through the prefecture. National routes 4, 7, and 45 are primary routes that link the prefectural capital to the capitals of other prefectures across Japan. Additional national routes in Aomori Prefecture include routes 101, 102, 102, 103, 104, 279, 280, 282, 338, 339, 340, 394, and 454. Two of the prefecture's national highways also continue north across the Tsugaru Strait to Hokkaido: National Route 279, which is carried to Hakodate by the Tsugaru Kaikyō Ferry; and National Route 280, which was previously carried by ferry to the town of Fukushima, Hokkaido, though the route is still signed from Fukushima to Hakodate.

Railroads have played an important role in Aomori Prefecture's transportation network and development since the Meiji period. Aomori Station, Shin-Aomori Station, Hachinohe Station, Hirosaki Station, and Shichinohe-Towada Station are major rail stations operating in Aomori Prefecture. The East Japan Railway Company (JR East), operates several rail lines in the prefecture: the Tōhoku Shinkansen, the Tōhoku Main Line, the Ōu Main Line, the Ōminato Line, the Gonō Line, the Hachinohe Line, and the Tsugaru Line. Other notable rail operators in the prefecture are the Hokkaido Railway Company (JR Hokkaido), that runs the Hokkaido Shinkansen through the Seikan Tunnel to and from Hokkaido, the Aoimori Railway that operates passenger services on the Tōhoku Main Line, and the northernmost privately owned railway in Japan, the Tsugaru Railway.

Maritime transport in Aomori Prefecture operates primarily from the ports of Aomori, Mutsuogawara, and Hachinohe, though smaller ports are found throughout the prefecture. The ports at Aomori and Hachinohe both serve cruise ships and ferry lines. Additionally, a ferry line operates between Ōma and Hakodate. Prior to the opening of the Seikan Tunnel, rail ferries operated by the Japanese National Railways linked Aomori Station and Hakodate Station as the primary connection between Hokkaido and the rest of Japan. A museum dedicated to the historic rail ferries operates near Aomori Station in a former rail ferryboat, the Hakkoda Maru.

There are two commercial airports located within Aomori Prefecture, Aomori Airport and Misawa Airport. Both airports are relatively small, though Aomori Airport offers regular international flights to South Korea and Taiwan, seasonal flights to China, and chartered flights to Thailand, in addition to domestic flights to several cities.

Education
Aomori Prefecture's national university is Hirosaki University, which was formed by the combination of several colleges and higher education schools in 1949 in accordance with the National School Establishment Law of 1949. The prefecture has two other public universities, Aomori Public University and the Aomori University of Health and Welfare. Several private universities are also located in Aomori Prefecture. Among them are Aomori University, Hachinohe Gakuin University, Hachinohe Institute of Technology, Hirosaki Gakuin University, Hirosaki University of Health and Welfare, Tohoku Women's College, and the Towada Campus of Kitasato University.

The Aomori Prefecture Board of Education oversees various aspects of the prefecture's educational system including the management of libraries, the Aomori Prefectural Museum, and various educational support offices and centers. In all the prefecture allocated 130.3 billion yen towards education in 2018. In 2017 the prefecture's public school system was teaching 133,507 primary and secondary students, a sharp decrease from a total of 173,537 students ten years earlier. Overall the prefecture has 94 kindergartens (1 of which is a national school and 3 that are public), 289 elementary schools (1 of which is a national school and 288 that are run by municipal governments), 161 middle schools (1 of which is a national school, another which is run by the prefecture, 4 that are private, and 155 that are run by municipal governments), and 95 high schools.

Symbols and names
During the Lowell Observatory Near-Earth-Object Search conducted in Flagstaff, Arizona for main-belt asteroids that have a risk of coming close to Earth, observers discovered 19701 Aomori, an asteroid which they named after Aomori Prefecture. 19701 Aomori was given its name on 9 May 2012 after the 2011 Tōhoku earthquake and tsunami to pay respect towards the damaged communities along the prefecture's southeastern coast.

Prefectural symbols
Since 1961, the prefectural symbol of Aomori is a green stylized map of the prefecture on a white background, showing the crown of Honshū: the Tsugaru, Natsudomari and Shimokita Peninsulas. The green is representative of development while the white symbolizes the vastness of the world.

The prefectural bird has been Bewick's swan since 1964, the species migrates to the area during the winter. In 1966, the prefecture designated the hiba (Thujopsis dolabrata) as its prefectural tree. The apple blossom was designated as the prefectural flower in 1971 to pay homage to the prefecture's apple production. In 1987, the Japanese halibut was designated as the prefectural fish.

Dialects
Tōhoku dialect, one of the three main dialects of Japan, is spoken in Aomori Prefecture. The most widespread variants are the Tsugaru dialect, Nanbu dialect, and Shimokita dialect. The boundary determining which of these dialects are spoken is mainly along the former border of the Tsugaru and Nanbu clans between Hiranai and Noheji, with some overlap. Speakers of the Tsugaru dialect are typically centered around Hirosaki, while those who use the Nanbu dialect are centered around Hachinohe. The Shimokita dialect is used on the Shimokita Peninsula around Mutsu and has been recognized as having enough differences to distinguish it from the Nanbu dialect. It was also used in combination with the Nanbu dialect in an early Japanese–Russian dictionary written by a man whose father came from the Shimokita Peninsula.

The oldest discovered compilation of words and phrases of the Nanbu dialect was written in 1790 followed by a dictionary of the Tsugaru dialect in 1809. Special features of the Aomori dialects include an atypical intonation, voicing consonants that are typically unvoiced (e.g. [k] sounds become [g]), and the addition of voiced velar nasal sounds and corresponding kana (か゚ [ŋa],  き゚ [ŋi], く゚ [ŋu], け゚ [ŋe], and こ゚ [ŋo]).

There is a negative connotation that surrounds people who speak this dialect, labeling them as lazy country folks. Due to this negativity speakers of Tōhoku dialects will often hide their accents. A study performed in 2016 indicated that people from Aomori who are 70 years and older frequently use these dialects, while use becomes less frequent the younger a person is regardless of fluency. Additionally, the study revealed that when traveling to Tokyo, older generations will continue to use their dialect, while younger generations switch to standard Japanese. On the other hand, over half of each generation surveyed preferred to use their local dialect when talking to Tokyoites in Aomori Prefecture.

Media
The largest newspaper by readership in Aomori Prefecture is The Tōō Nippō Press with a daily readership of 245,000, 56% of the total share of the newspaper market in the prefecture. The newspaper also runs a radio news station which is broadcast by the Aomori Broadcasting Corporation (RAB). Other local newspapers are Hachinohe's The Daily Tōhoku Shimbun, Hirosaki's The Mutsu Shimpo, and Kuroishi's Tsugaru Shinpō.

Four television stations are broadcast in Aomori Prefecture. RAB is a television and radio broadcaster based in the capital that is affiliated with the Japan Radio Network, National Radio Network, and Nippon News Network. RAB uses the call signs JOGR-DTV for digital television broadcasts and JOGE, JOGO, and JOGR for radio broadcasts in Hirosaki, Hachinohe, and Aomori, respectively. Japan News Network's affiliate, Aomori Television began broadcasting with the call sign JOAI on 1 December 1969. Asahi Broadcasting Aomori. NHK broadcasts radio, television, and digital television from NHK Aomori with the call signs JOTC and JOTG. NHK radio services began on 17 April 1941, while television broadcasts commenced on 22 March 1959.

Hani Motoko, a native of Hachinohe, is considered to be Japan's first female journalist. She became known for her column about famous Japanese women that began publication in 1897 in the Hōchi Shimbun. Motoko later started a journal, that focused on the values of middle-class women.

Notable people from Aomori Prefecture

 Osamu Dazai, author
 Miki Furukawa, musician, and former bass guitarist and singer for the Japanese rock band Supercar
 Miki Hanada, nurse
 Junji Ishiwatari, musician, and former guitarist and songwriter for the Japanese rock band Supercar
 Shunsuke Kikuchi, composer
 Daimaō Kosaka, comedian known widely for his single "PPAP (Pen-Pineapple-Apple-Pen)"
 Kenichi Matsuyama, actor
 Daisuke Matsuzaka, former Major League Baseball pitcher
 Hani Motoko, journalist
 Shikō Munakata, artist and the recipient of the 1970 Order of Culture
 Koji Nakamura, musician, and former guitarist and lead singer for the Japanese rock band Supercar
 Nitta Hachirō, singer of popular and classical music from the early Shōwa era.
 Yoshie Shiratori, escape artist
 Chikuzan Takahashi, musician
 Daigo Umehara, fighting game player, one of the most successful Street Fighter players
 Yoshisada Yonezuka, martial arts instructor

References

External links

Aomori Prefecture Official Website 
Aomori Prefecture Official Website 

 
Tōhoku region
Prefectures of Japan
1871 establishments in Japan